Melbourne Express was a free newspaper distributed on weekday mornings at railway stations in Melbourne, Australia. It was published by Fairfax Media.

Melbourne Express was launched on 5 February 2001, one day before mX, another free newspaper also aimed at commuters, but distributed in the evenings was launched by News Corporation. 

Melbourne Express ceased publication on the 7 September 2001. The final edition featured a single frontpage headline stating "Goodbye, and thanks for all the fish" with short explanation explaining the reason for the decision.

References

Daily newspapers published in Australia
Free daily newspapers
Defunct newspapers published in Melbourne
Publications established in 2001
Publications disestablished in 2001
2001 establishments in Australia
2001 disestablishments in Australia